The Pustertaler Sprinzen, also called Pustertaler or , is a rare breed of cattle from the Puster Valley in the autonomous province of Bolzano, now in north-eastern Italy. Genetic research carried out in 2001 showed the Barà breed of the province of Turin to be closely similar to the Pustertaler; the two populations have since 2002 been treated and registered as a single breed. It is one of the sixteen minor Italian cattle breeds of limited diffusion recognised and protected by the Ministero delle Politiche Agricole Alimentari e Forestali, the Italian ministry of agriculture.

History
Pustertaler cattle originate from an area that includes the Pustertal and its tributary valleys, and the eastern parts of the Eisacktal or Isarco valley. The Pustertaler was highly esteemed for its milk, and commanded high prices. A herd-book was opened in 1900, and several breeder associations formed in the next few years. However, some Pustertal farmers replaced the animals they had sold with cheaper stock from Carinthia, which led to a decline in quality. The First World War and the cession of South Tyrol to Italy under the Treaty of Saint-Germain of 1919 led to a decline in numbers also, and the herd-book was not maintained after 1920. After the ending of inspection for bull licensing through a Decree of the Agrarian Inspectorate in 1927 the cattle breed collapsed. An attempt to revive the fortunes of the breed was made between 1954 and 1967; approximately 300 cows and 500 calves were registered during this period. Italian regional cattle breeds of limited diffusion, including the Pustertaler, came under ministerial protection in 1985. Responsibility for registration of these breeds was delegated to the Associazione Italiana Allevatori, the national breeders' association, in 1991. Between 1983 and 2002 breed numbers remained low; numbers in 2002 were variously estimated at 635 head (with less than 100 cows registered); and at about 200.

The two populations have since 2002 been treated and registered as a single breed. The Barà race numbered several thousand, so overall breed numbers increased substantially. A total population of 3321 head was reported in 2009.

Characteristics
The cattle are finched and colour-sided: they are basically white with chestnut-brown to light brown or black plaques on the flanks that dissolve into small spots at the margins. They have short spreading or forward pointing horns.

The breed is reared in Austria, Germany, Italy and South Africa.

References

Cattle breeds originating in South Tyrol
Cattle breeds
Cattle breeds originating in Italy